Corradino may refer to:

Given name
Corradino Campisi (born 1948), Italian medical academic
Corradino D'Ascanio (1891–1981), Italian aeronautical engineer
Corradino Mineo (born 1950), Italian journalist and politician

Fictional
Corradino, Cuor di ferro, hero of  Rossini's opera Matilde di Shabran

Surname
Claudio Corradino (born 1959), Italian politician

Other
Corradino Batteries, series of artillery batteries on Corradino Heights, near Paola, Malta
Corradino Lines, line of fortification on Corradino in Paola, Malta
Corradino prison, Paola, Malta